Kay Harris (August 19, 1919 – October 23, 1971) was an American actress who starred in eight films during the 1940s, including the title role in Tillie the Toiler. She was married to the cinematographer Henry Freulich.

Filmography
 Tillie the Toiler (1941)
 Parachute Nurse (1942)
 Lucky Legs (1942)
 Sabotage Squad (1942)
 Smith of Minnesota (1942)
 The Spirit of Stanford (1942)
 Robin Hood of the Range (1943)
 The Fighting Buckaroo (1943)

References

Bibliography
 Blottner, Gene. Columbia Pictures Movie Series, 1926-1955: The Harry Cohn Years. McFarland, 2011.

External links

1919 births
1971 deaths
American film actresses
People from Elkhorn, Wisconsin
Actresses from Wisconsin
20th-century American actresses